Clifton Duane Bloomfield (born March 1969) is an American serial killer and former movie extra who was convicted of murdering five people around Albuquerque, New Mexico, between 2005 and 2008. In the midst of his murders Bloomfield made appearances as a background character in multiple movies and TV shows, including Felon (2008) and Breaking Bad (2008–2013).

Early life 
Clifton Duane Bloomfield was raised in Kingman, Arizona. His earliest known encounter with the law came in 1979 when, after a BB gun incident, a judge ordered him to be on probation until his 18th birthday and enroll at a children's home in Tucson. After his release he returned home to his parents. Regarded as a bully, Bloomfield' parents forced him to go to mental health clinics every day and gave him Mesoridazine, a drug to treat schizophrenia. Bloomfield's criminal habits nevertheless continued, and at age 13 he stole a motorcycle and later broke into a church. In 1989 Bloomfield and his sister went on a crime spree in Phoenix, which consequently netted him in prison for 14 years. He was released in 2002.

October 2005 murders 
During the night of October 24, 2005, Bloomfield ate at a Fuddruckers restaurant in Albuquerque. After leaving, according to Bloomfield's story of events, 37-year-old Carlos Esquibel approached him and reportedly started to hit on him, with Esquibel being gay. Bloomfield, though not gay, went along with Esquibel and agreed to go back Esquibel's apartment along Walter SE. When in Esquibel's bedroom, Bloomfield attacked him and ripped his shirt off, which he used to twist around Esquibel's neck to strangle him to death. After the violent murder Bloomfield searched through the apartment for valuables. He left soon after, and the body was found hours later by the apartment landlord. 

On October 27, Bloomfield reportedly was out on a walk late at night when he noticed the backdoor of a house slightly ajar. Bloomfield later stated to police that "there wasn't anybody moving, so I went in". In the home he searched through a purse on the kitchen table, but finding that nothing was in there he decided to take a tour of the home. In one of the bedrooms Bloomfield found jewelry, which he subsequently pocketed. Soon after, the home's owner, 81-year-old Josephine Selvage, a retired elementary school teacher suffering from Alzheimer's disease, attempted to attack Bloomfield. He subsequently fought back and overpowered Selvage, strangling her as she kicked and tried to scream. After Selvage went unresponsive, Bloomfield kept looking through the home, but eventually left as he did not feel like stealing anything. Since the two murders occurred just days apart and in close proximity to each other, police investigated a link, but later falsely came to the conclusion that the two murders were unrelated.

Hiatus 
Two months after the murders, Bloomfield approached an elderly couple at gunpoint in the village of Los Ranchos and forced them to let them in their garage, where he stole a stack of cash. Later that day he proposed to his girlfriend. Months later U.S. Marshals arrested Bloomfield in Texas for the Los Ranchos home invasion. He was brought back to New Mexico, and although he pledged his innocence, he ended up pleading guilty and served 18 months in jail. After his release he went back to working as a roofer.

After his release Bloomfield found work as movie extra. During this time, he appeared on the sets of such movies and TV shows such as Felon (2008) and Breaking Bad (2008–2013).

2007–2008 murders 

Bloomfield resumed killing in December 2007. On December 4, he prowled through the backyard of a home on Avenida la Costa NE. He made his way into the house via the glass sliding door, where the homeowner, 79-year-old Tak Yi, attempted to attack Bloomfield. Bloomfield was able to overpower Tak and beat him to death. Soon after he killed Tak's wife Pung, 69, although he claims a friend of his did it. Days after the murders of the Yi's, police arrested two magazine salesmen for the killings, one of whom confessed. Both were later released from custody after Bloomfield's arrest.

On June 28, 2008, Bloomfield colluded with Jason Skiggs, 35, to kill a man only known as Manny. Bloomfield and Skiggs brandished ski masks, vests, and shotguns to break into the home. When they did, they discovered Katherine Bailey and her husband 40-year-old nurse Scott Pierce but thinking Pierce was Manny they killed him.

Arrest 
On July 1, 2008, Bloomfield and Skiggs were arrested for the murder of Scott Pierce. Bloomfield was soon linked to the other crimes via DNA. He pleaded guilty to all counts and was sentenced to 195 years in prison.

See also 
 List of serial killers in the United States

References 

1969 births
2005 murders in the United States
2007 murders in the United States
2008 murders in the United States
21st-century American criminals
American male criminals
American people convicted of murder
American prisoners sentenced to life imprisonment
American serial killers
Living people
Male serial killers
People convicted of murder by New Mexico